The Hunzibs are an indigenous people of Dagestan, North Caucasia living in three villages in the Tsuntinsky District in the upper regions of the Avar-Koysu river area. They have their own language, Hunzib, and primarily follow Sunni Islam, which reached the Hunzib people around the 8th or 9th century. Islam became consolidated among the Hunzib around the 16th and 17th centuries. The land where the Hunzibs inhabit was part of the Avar Khanate. The only time that the Hunzibs were counted as a distinct ethnic group in the Russian Census was in 1926, when 105 people reported to be ethnic Hunzibs. Subsequently, they were listed as Avars in the Russian Censuses. In 1967, it was estimated that there were about 600 ethnic Hunzibs (E. Bokarev).

References

The peoples of the Red Book: Tindis

Ethnic groups in Dagestan
Muslim communities of Russia
Peoples of the Caucasus
Muslim communities of the Caucasus